Constantin-Grigore Dumitrescu, also known as Constantin Ticu Dumitrescu or Ticu Dumitrescu (27 May 1928 – 5 December 2008), Olari, Prahova, was a Romanian politician and president of the Association of Romanian Former Political Prisoners. He was noted as a leading figure in the anti-communist resistance in Romania and for initiating the country's Conspiracy of Security law.

Background 
Dumitrescu was born on May 27, 1928 in the Prahova region. He studied law in the university but was arrested in 1949 due to his political activities. He then worked as a construction laborer after he was rejected by Romanian universities when he attempted to go back to school. He was incarcerated again in 1958 and was sentenced to a 23-year forced-labor on the charge of conspiring against the state. He was freed in 1964.

Dumitrescu became a member of the Christian Democratic National Peasants' Party and was elected as Romanian Senator from 1992 to 2000. During his tenure, he promoted laws that protect citizens against the persecutions of the Romanian secret police as well as the interests of political prisoners. For instance, he drafted the legislation that opened the files of the Securitate, which included documents that contain information on people spying on citizens.

Dumitrescu died December 5, 2008 in Bucharest due to liver cancer.

References

People from Prahova County
Christian Democratic National Peasants' Party politicians
Members of the Senate of Romania
1928 births
2008 deaths
Deaths from cancer in Romania
Romanian dissidents
Prisoners and detainees of Romania